Stones, or rocks, are naturally occurring masses of minerals.

Stones may also refer to:

Literature
 Stones (comic), a story in the Star Wars Tales comic book series
 Stones (novel), a 2001 novel by William E. Bell
 Stones (short story collection), a 1988 book by Timothy Findley

Music
 The Rolling Stones, often referred to as "the Stones"

Albums
 Stones (Alfabeats Nu Jazz album) or the title song, 2006
 Stones (Dan Seals album) or the title song, 1980
 Stones (Manafest album) or the title song, 2017
 Stones (Neil Diamond album) or the title song, 1971

Songs
 "Stones" (The Rolling Stones song), properly "Stoned", 1963
 "Stones" (Zibbz song), 2018
 "Stones", by Bruce Springsteen from Western Stars, 2019
 "Stones", by Sonic Youth from Sonic Nurse, 2004
 "Stones", by Status Quo from If You Can't Stand the Heat..., 1978

Other uses
 Stone (unit), a measure of weight formerly used in various Germanic European countries and still commonly used in Great Britain and Ireland for measuring human body weight
 Stones (film), a 2002 Spanish film
 Stones (surname), people with the surname
 Stones Brewery, a defunct British brewery
 Stones, a 1991 computer game in the Microsoft Entertainment Pack 2

See also
 
 Stone (disambiguation)
 The Stone (disambiguation)
 The Stones (disambiguation)